Chechenino is a rural locality (a village) in Andreyevskoye Rural Settlement, Kishertsky District, Perm Krai, Russia. The population was 6 as of 2010.

Geography 
Chechenino is located 26 km northeast of Ust-Kishert (the district's administrative centre) by road. Petryata is the nearest rural locality.

References 

Rural localities in Kishertsky District